Toyota Motor Manufacturing Russia was one of Toyota's vehicle production bases in Europe. It was located in Shushary, Saint Petersburg, Russia, and it manufactured the Camry and the RAV4.

History

On 14 June 2005, the construction of the new plant began and it opened on 21 December 2007 with the production of the sixth generation Toyota Camry. On 1 March 2022, due to the Russian invasion of Ukraine, Toyota announced that their plant will close and all activity will be suspended. On 23 September 2022, Toyota officially closed the TMMR plant.

Production
Camry (2007–2022)
RAV4 (2016–2022)

References

External links
 

Toyota factories
Defunct motor vehicle manufacturers of Russia
Manufacturing companies based in Saint Petersburg
Motor vehicle assembly plants in Russia
Vehicle manufacturing companies established in 2005
Vehicle manufacturing companies disestablished in 2022
2005 establishments in Russia
2022 disestablishments in Russia
Russian subsidiaries of foreign companies